Ahmed Belkessam (born 27 March 1962) is a retired Algerian middle-distance runner who specialized in the 800 meters. He represented his country at the 1984 and 1988 Summer Olympics as well as one indoor and one outdoor World Championships. In addition, he won several medals on regional level.

Competition record

Personal bests
Outdoor
800 metres – 1:45.43 (Bologna 1990)
1000 metres – 2:18.25 (Villeneuve-d'Ascq 1993)
1500 metres – 3:45.36 (Monaco 1994)
Indoor
800 metres – 1:47.80 (Ancona 1987)
1000 metres – 2:21.21 (The Hague 1991)

References

External links
All-Athletics profile

1962 births
Living people
Algerian male middle-distance runners
World Athletics Championships athletes for Algeria
Athletes (track and field) at the 1984 Summer Olympics
Athletes (track and field) at the 1988 Summer Olympics
Olympic athletes of Algeria
Competitors at the 1986 Goodwill Games
21st-century Algerian people
20th-century Algerian people